Chapters is the third and last full-length album released by Christian rock band Forever Changed.

Track listing 
 "Chapters"
 "Never Look Down"
 "Starting To Sink"
 "All I Need"
 "The Runaway"
 "Time Will Change Everything"
 "The Disconnect"
 "It’s Too Late"
 "Refusal"
 "No Way Out"
 "Cradle Eyes"
 "Letting Go of You"

Credits 
 Dan Cole: lead vocals, guitar, piano
 Ben O'Rear: lead guitar, background vocals
 Tom Gustafson: bass guitar
 Nathan Lee: drums

References 

Forever Changed albums
2006 albums